John Campbell Rattray (14 October 1890 – 1958) was an early twentieth-century Scottish football inside forward who played professionally in Scotland and the United States.

Playing career

Scotland
Rattray was born in Lumphinnans, Fife, Scotland. In February 1910 he began his professional career with Falkirk of the Scottish Football League First Division. He spent two full seasons at Falkirk before transferring to Raith Rovers in 1913, but his career was interrupted, along with so many others, by the outbreak of World War I in 1914. Rattray served along with other footballers in McCrae's Battalion of the Royal Scots during the war, not returning to football until January 1919 when he signed with Dumbarton. He then moved back to Raith Rovers for three more years. In recognition of his service to the Kirkcaldy club he was awarded a benefit match, which was played against a Fifeshire Select on 4 January 1921.

United States
In 1922, Rattray left Scotland to sign with the Bethlehem Steel of the American Soccer League. His last game with the team came in the final of the 1924 American Cup. He was not slated to start the game, but was written in to fill in for an injured teammate. His selection paid dividends when he scored the game's only goal, giving Steel its sixth American Cup title. At the time it was said of him:

Rattray retired following the 1923–1924 season, returning to Scotland where he settled in Cowdenbeath.

Coaching career
In 1928 he went for two years to Belgium as coach for second division team TSV Lyra.

Honours 
Bethlehem Steel
American Cup: 1924
American Soccer League Runners-up: 1923–24

References

1890 births
1958 deaths
American Soccer League (1921–1933) players
Bethlehem Steel F.C. (1907–1930) players
British Army personnel of World War I
Dumbarton F.C. players
Falkirk F.C. players
Ayr United F.C. players
People from Lumphinnans
Raith Rovers F.C. players
Scottish footballers
Scottish expatriate footballers
Scottish football managers
Scottish expatriate football managers
McCrae's Battalion
Association football inside forwards
Association football wing halves
Scottish expatriate sportspeople in the United States
Expatriate soccer players in the United States
Scottish expatriate sportspeople in Belgium
Expatriate football managers in Belgium
K. Lyra managers
Expatriate soccer managers in the United States
American Soccer League (1921–1933) coaches
Footballers from Fife